Siegfried John Enns (26 April 192425 January 2020) was a Progressive Conservative party member of the House of Commons of Canada. He was a social worker by career.

He was first elected at the Portage—Neepawa riding in the 1962 general election, then re-elected there in 1963 and 1965. With riding boundary changes, Enns sought re-election at the Portage riding for the 1968 election but was defeated by Gerald Cobbe of the Liberal party. He died on 25 January 2020, aged 95.

His brother Harry Enns was a long-serving (1966–2003) member of the Legislative Assembly of Manitoba.

References

External links
 

1924 births
2020 deaths
Members of the House of Commons of Canada from Manitoba
Progressive Conservative Party of Canada MPs
Russian emigrants to Canada
Canadian Mennonites